Leather Lane is a street west of Hatton Garden, in the Holborn area of London.  It is home to a well-used weekday market which specialises in clothing, footwear and fruit and vegetables. There are now many food retailers capitalising off the lunchtime trade offering a range of different foods from falafel wraps and burritos to hog roasts and jacket potatoes. 

The lane was laid out in the medieval period following old fields and property boundaries.

The Bourne Estate is a group of well-regarded Edwardian tenement blocks on the west side of the Lane.

References

Streets in the London Borough of Camden
Shopping streets in London